Andrew Moran (born 15 October 2003) is an Irish professional footballer who plays as a midfielder for the academy of Premier League club Brighton & Hove Albion.

Club career

Bray Wanderers
Raised in the Dublin suburb of Knocklyon, Moran started out at his local club Knocklyon United. He later moved to top schoolboy club St Joseph's Boys, before moving onto the academy of League of Ireland club Bray Wanderers who St Joseph's are a feeder club of. He made his first team debut for the club in a victory over Drogheda United in August 2019 aged just 15 years 307 days old, making him the youngest player in the club's history. On 28 February 2020, he became the club's youngest ever goalscorer at 16 years 135 days old when he scored in a 2–0 win over Wexford at the Carlisle Grounds. Moran made a total of 3 senior appearances during his time with the club.

Brighton & Hove Albion
In July 2020, he signed for the academy of Brighton & Hove Albion, alongside Bray Wanderers teammate Leigh Kavanagh. April 2021 saw Moran linked with a move to fellow Premier League sides Manchester United and Chelsea. After a year at the club, he signed his first professional contract with the club in July 2021. On 24 August 2021, he made his first team debut, coming off the bench in the 67th minute of a 2–0 win away to Cardiff City in the EFL Cup. 

Moran signed a three year contract extension with the club in August 2022.
He made his first Premier League appearance on 3 January 2023, coming on as a 79th minute substitute replacing Solly March in a 4–1 away win over Everton.

International career
Moran has captained the Republic of Ireland under-15s and has also represented his country at under-16, under-17 and under-19 level. On 27 August 2021, he was called up alongside Brighton & Hove Albion teammate Evan Ferguson to the Republic of Ireland U21 for the first time, for their 2023 UEFA European Under-21 Championship qualifiers against Bosnia and Herzegovina & Luxembourg. He made his Ireland under-21 debut in a 1–1 draw with Luxembourg at the Stade Jos Nosbaum in Dudelange on 7 September 2021. Moran's first international goal came on 29 March 2022 in the Republic of Ireland U19's 4–0 win over Armenia U19 in the 2022 UEFA European Under-19 Championship qualifying Elite round.

Career statistics

References

Living people
2003 births
Association football midfielders
Association footballers from County Dublin
Republic of Ireland association footballers
Bray Wanderers F.C. players
Brighton & Hove Albion F.C. players
League of Ireland players
Expatriate footballers in England
Republic of Ireland expatriate association footballers
Republic of Ireland under-21 international footballers
Republic of Ireland youth international footballers
Irish expatriate sportspeople in England